The New England Football League (NEFL) is a semi-professional american football league based in Salisbury, Massachusetts and owned by Thomas Torrisi. It is the largest semi-professional league in New England. The NEFL was founded in 1994 and was also known as the Greater Lawrence Men's Football League. In 2022, it comprises 11 teams, down from a recent high of 32, with about 2,000 players.

Since 2022, the NEFL has had single-A, and AA Conferences, with annual promotion and relegation among Conferences based on game results, so that the best teams work their way toward the AA level.

The league provides competitive football for adult players. It is a "working man's league", as most players have regular jobs during the week. Teams practice on weeknights and play virtually all games on weekends. Players are not paid for their participation, but they often pay $200 to be on the team's roster. The league runs from July through September, followed by single-elimination championship tournaments within each Conference. Each team can dress up to 55 players.

League history 
The New England Football League was founded in 1994 by League President and Director of Marketing, Tom Torrisi, Chairman Matt Brien, Commissioner Bob Oreal, Vice-President and Treasurer John Motta and Secretary Christine Torrisi. It started its 1994 season with four teams. By 1997, the number of teams tripled to twelve; in 2002, the league had at least one team in each New England state, and started its three-conference alignment with three different skill levels, one for each conference. The 2006 was the first season with at least 30 teams, making the NEFL one of the largest semi-pro football leagues in the country.

The league is unrelated to the original NEFL, which operated from 1964 to 1969.

Game rules 
The NEFL describes its rule set as "modified NCAA rules". Most rules are adopted from the NCAA rulebook, but there are also a few NFL rules and NEFL-specific rules. Games use a free-running clock until five minutes left in either half or overtime, at which time the clock stops according to NFL rules. Game time is usually kept by an official on the field, but for some games is kept on the scoreboard by a paid, uniformed official operating it.

Current teams

North Atlantic Conference (AA) (2022)

Maritime Conference (A) (2022)

League champions

External links
Official league website

References

Semi-professional American football
American football in Massachusetts
Professional sports leagues in the United States